Sabina Yashar gizi Aliyeva (born May 7, 1980), is an Azerbaijani civil servant, the Commissioner for Human Rights (Ombudsman) of the Azerbaijan Republic (since 2019).

Biography
Sabina Aliyeva was born in Baku on May 7, 1980. In 1996 she finished the secondary school № 8 in Baku with distinction. In this year she entered into the Law faculty of Baku State University and graduated from this university in 2000 with distinction. In 2002 she got master's degree on the specialty of State Law in the Law faculty of Baku State University.

Since 2009 till 2012 she studied International relations in the Academy of Public Administration under the President of the Republic of Azerbaijan. In 2016 Aliyeva received the PhD in Law. She defended the thesis on the specialty of "International Law; Human Rights".

On November 29, 2019, Sabina Aliyeva was elected as the Commissioner for Human Rights (Ombudsman) of the Republic of Azerbaijan by the National Assembly among three candidates presented to this position by the President of the Republic of Azerbaijan. 

Aliyeva is married and has two children. Her husband is a Member of the National Assembly of Azerbaijan Siyavush Novruzov.

She was awarded with the medal "For Services in the field of Military Cooperation" on behalf of the President of the Republic of Azerbaijan by the relevant order of the Minister of Defense of the Republic of Azerbaijan dated December 29, 2020.

References

Links 
 Oficial website of Ombudsman of Azerbaijan

1980 births
Living people
Azerbaijani women scientists
Baku State University alumni
Ombudspersons in Azerbaijan
People from Baku